Anne-Katrin Schott (born 21 December 1959) is a retired German swimmer. In 1974, aged 14, she set a world record and weeks later won a silver medal in the 200 m breaststroke at the 1974 European Aquatics Championships. Between 1974 and 1975 she won three national titles in the 200 m breaststroke and 4 × 100 m medley relay events.

References

1960 births
Living people
German female swimmers
German female breaststroke swimmers
European Aquatics Championships medalists in swimming